Philip Bernard McCumisky (28 May 1897 – 2 August 1970) was an Australian rules footballer who played with Carlton in the Victorian Football League (VFL). 

He later served in a variety of administrative roles at Carlton, including serving as the Blues’ honorary doctor for almost 20 years.

Notes

External links 

Phil McCumisky's profile at Blueseum

1897 births
1970 deaths
Australian rules footballers from Victoria (Australia)
Carlton Football Club players
Old Xaverians Football Club players